Erythropterus cuissi is a species of beetle in the family Cerambycidae. It was described by Napp and Monné in 2005.

References

Heteropsini
Beetles described in 2005